Post-war immigration to Australia deals with migration to Australia in the decades immediately following World War II, and in particular refers to the predominantly European wave of immigration which occurred between 1945 and the end of the White Australia policy in 1973. In the immediate aftermath of World War II, Ben Chifley, Prime Minister of Australia (1945–1949), established the federal Department of Immigration to administer a large-scale immigration program. Chifley commissioned a report on the subject which found that Australia was in urgent need of a larger population for the purposes of defence and development and it recommended a 1% annual increase in population through increased immigration.

The first Minister for Immigration, Arthur Calwell, promoted mass immigration with the slogan "populate or perish". Calwell coined the term "New Australians" in an effort to supplant such terms as pommy (Englishman) and wog.

The 1% target remained a part of government policy until the Whitlam Government (1972–1975), when immigration numbers were substantially cut back, only to be restored by the Fraser Government (1975–1982).

Some 4.2 million immigrants arrived between 1945 and 1985, about 40 percent of whom came from Britain and Ireland. 182,159 people were sponsored by the International Refugee Organisation (IRO) from the end of World War II up to the end of 1954 to resettle in Australia from Europe—more than the number of convicts transported to Australia in the first 80 years after European settlement.

"Populate or perish" policy

The Chifley years

Following the attacks on Darwin and the associated fear of Imperial Japanese invasion in World War II, the Chifley Government commissioned a report on the subject which found that Australia was in urgent need of a larger population for the purposes of defence and development and it recommended a 1% annual increase in population through increased immigration. In 1945, the government established the federal Department of Immigration to administer the new immigration program. The first Minister for Immigration was Arthur Calwell. An Assisted Passage Migration Scheme was also established in 1945 to encourage Britons to migrate to Australia. The government's objective was summarised in the slogan "populate or perish". Calwell stated in 1947, to critics of mass immigration from non-British Europe: "We have 25 years at most to populate this country before the yellow races are down on us."

The post-war immigration program of the Chifley Government gave them preference to migrants from Great Britain, and initially an ambitious target was set of nine British out of ten immigrants. However, it was soon apparent that even with assisted passage the government target would be impossible to achieve given that Britain's shipping capacity was quite diminished from pre-war levels. As a consequence, the government looked further afield to maintain overall immigration numbers, and this meant relying on the IRO refugees from Eastern Europe, with the USA providing the necessary shipping. Many Eastern Europeans were refugees from the Red Army and thus mostly anti-Communist and so politically acceptable.

Menzies years

The 1% target survived a change of government in 1949, when the Menzies Government succeeded Chifley's. The new Minister of Immigration was Harold Holt (1949–56).

The British component remained the largest component of the migrant intake until 1953. Between 1953 and late 1956, migrants from Southern Europe outnumbered the British, and this caused some alarm in the Australian government, causing it to place restrictions on Southern Europeans sponsoring newcomers and to commence the "Bring out a Briton" campaign. With the increase in financial assistance to British settlers provided during the 1960s, the British component was able to return to the top position in the overall number of new settlers.

Hundreds of thousands of displaced Europeans migrated to Australia and over 1,000,000 Britons immigrated with financial assistance. The migration assistance scheme initially targeted citizens of Commonwealth countries; but it was gradually extended to other countries such as the Netherlands and Italy. The qualifications were straightforward: migrants needed to be in sound health and under the age of 45 years. There were initially no skill requirements, although under the White Australia policy, people from mixed-race backgrounds found it very difficult to take advantage of the scheme.

Migration brought large numbers of southern and central Europeans to Australia for the first time. A 1958 government leaflet assured voters that unskilled non-British migrants were needed for "labour on rugged projects ...work which is not generally acceptable to Australians or British workers." The Australian economy stood in sharp contrast to war-ravaged Europe, and newly arrived migrants found employment in a booming manufacturing industry and government assisted programmes such as the Snowy Mountains Scheme. This hydroelectricity and irrigation complex in south-east Australia consisted of sixteen major dams and seven power stations constructed between 1949 and 1974. It remains the largest engineering project undertaken in Australia. Necessitating the employment of 100,000 people from over 30 countries, to many it denotes the birth of multicultural Australia.

In 1955 the one-millionth post-war immigrant arrived in Australia.  Australia's population reached 10 million in 1959, up from 7 million in 1945.

End to the White Australia policy
In 1973, Whitlam Government (1972–1975) adopted a completely non-discriminatory immigration policy, effectively putting an end to the White Australia policy.  However, the change occurred in the context of a substantial reduction in the overall migrant intake. This ended the post-war wave of predominantly European immigration which had started three decades before with the end of the Second World War and would make the beginnings of the contemporary wave of predominantly Asian Immigration to Australia which continues to the present day.

International agreements 
Financial assistance was an important element of the post war immigration program and as such there were a number of agreements in place between the Australian government and various governments and international organisations.

 United Kingdom – free or assisted passages.  Immigrants under this scheme became known as Ten Pound Poms.
 Assisted passages for ex-servicemen of the British Empire and the United States.  This scheme was later extended to cover ex-servicemen and members of resistance movements from certain other Allied countries.
 An agreement with the International Refugee Organization (IRO) to settle at least 12,000 displaced people a year from camps in Europe. Australia accepted a disproportionate share of refugees sponsored by IRO in the late 1940s and early 1950s.
 Formal migration agreements, often involving the grant of assisted passage, with the United Kingdom, Malta, the Netherlands, Italy, West Germany, Turkey and Yugoslavia.
 There were also informal migration agreements with a number of other countries including Austria, Greece, Spain, and Belgium.

Timeline

Settler arrivals by top 10 countries of birth

Migrant reception and training centres 

On arrival in Australia, many migrants went to migrant reception and training centres where they learned some English while they looked for a job. The Department of Immigration was responsible for the camps and kept records on camp administration and residents. The migrant reception and training centres were also known as Commonwealth Immigration Camps, migrant hostels, immigration dependants' holding centres, migrant accommodation, or migrant workers' hostels.

Australia's first migrant reception centre opened at Bonegilla, Victoria near Wodonga in December 1947. When the camp closed in 1971, some 300,000 migrants had spent time there.

By 1951, the government had established three migrant reception centres for non-English speaking displaced persons from Europe, and twenty holding centres, principally to house non-working dependants, when the pressure of arrival numbers on the reception centres was too great to keep families together.  The purpose of reception and training centres was to:
provide for general medical examination and x-ray of migrants, issue of necessary clothing, payment of social service benefits, interview to determine employment potential, instruction in English and the Australian way of life generally.

The centres were located throughout Australia (dates are those of post office opening and closing.)

Queensland 

 Stuart
 Wacol
 Yungaba Immigration Centre (known today as Yungaba House)

New South Wales (NSW) 

 Bathurst (1948 to 1952)
 Bradfield Park, now Lindfield
 Chullora, a suburb of Sydney (1 August 1949 to 31 October 1967)
 Greta, near Newcastle (1 June 1949 to 15 January 1960)
 Uranquinty (1 December 1948 to 31 March 1959)

Other hostels in New South Wales included Adamstown, Balgownie, Bankstown, Berkeley, Bunnerong, Burwood, Cabramatta, Cronulla, Dundas, East Hills, Ermington, Goulburn, Katoomba, Kingsgrove, Kyeemagh, Leeton, Lithgow, Mascot, Matraville, Mayfield, Meadowbank, Nelson Bay, North Head, Orange, Parkes, Port Stephens, Randwick, St Marys, Scheyville, Schofields, Unanderra, Villawood, Wallerawang and Wallgrove.

Victoria 

 Bonegilla (December 1947 to 17 March 1971)
 Benalla (9 June 1949 to 30 May 1952)
 Mildura (1950 to 17 July 1953)
 Rushworth (1 June 1949 to 15 June 1953)
 Sale West (1950 to 30 November 1953)
 Somers (18 August 1949 to 14 February 1957)
 Fishermen's Bend, Victoria 1952.

South Australia 

 Elder Park
 Gepps Cross
 Glenelg
 Pennington/Finsbury
 Rosewater
 Smithfield
 Willaston
 Elphinstone
 Woodside

Western Australia 

 Northam Holden (15 August 1949 to 30 June 1957)
 Graylands
 Cunderdin
 Point Walter

Breakdown of arrivals by decade 

In the post-war wave of immigration Australia has experienced average arrivals of around one million per decade. The breakdown by decade is as follows:

 1.6 million between October 1945 and 30 June 1960;
 about 1.3 million in the 1960s; and
 about 960.000 in the 1970s;

The highest number of arrivals during the period was 185,099 in 1969–70 and the lowest was 52,752 in 1975–76.

2006 demographics of post-war period non-English speaking immigrant groups

In the 2006 census, birthplace was enumerated as was date of arrival in Australia for those not born in Australia.  For the major post-war period non-English speaking immigrant groups enlarged by the arrival of immigrants to Australia after World War II, they are still major demographic groups in Australia:

Not all of those enumerated would have arrived as post-war migrants, specific statistics as at 2006 are not available.

See also 

 Demographics of Australia
 European Australians
 Europeans in Oceania
 Immigration history of Australia

Notes

References

Further reading

External links

 
 (archived website)
  (South Australia)
 
 
 
  Ships and passenger lists

Aftermath of World War II
History of immigration to Australia
Aftermath of World War II in Australia